Carl Feer-Herzog  (23 October 1820 – 14 January 1880) was a Swiss politician and President of the Swiss National Council (1874).

Further reading

External links 
 
 
 

Members of the National Council (Switzerland)
Presidents of the National Council (Switzerland)
Swiss diplomats
1820 births
1880 deaths